Interstate Highways in Iowa form a network of freeways that cross the state.

Primary Interstates

Auxiliary Interstates

Business routes

References

External links

The Iowa Highways Page by Jason Hancock
Interstate Guide

Interstate